(8 May 1721 - 10 April 1792) was an eminent Japanese Zen Buddhist monk, teacher, author, painter and calligrapher. He was the chief disciple and Dharma heir of famed Japanese Rinzai master Hakuin Ekaku (1685-1786) and was a major figure in the revival of the Rinzai school in eighteenth century Japan. He is also known as the author of an influential text on Zen practice called "The Undying Lamp of Zen" (Shūmon mujintō ron), which is his magnum opus and presents the comprehensive system of Rinzai Zen as it existed at the time of Hakuin.

Biography 

Tōrei born in Kazaki, Shiga prefecture. When he was 5 years old, he met the respected Zen master Kogetsu Zenzai (1667-1751). This inspired him to begin his studies at a local monastery at the age of 9. When he was 17 he went to Daikō-ji in Kyushu, where he was ordained as a Buddhist monk by Kogetsu Zenzai. Under the direction of Kogetsu, Tōrei achieved his first kenshō experience.

After this experience, he set out on a pilgrimage to various Japanese monasteries. In 1743, Kogetsu suggested that he should visit Shōin-ji, where Tōrei was to meet the great Rinzai master Hakuin Ekaku and study Zen with him.

Tōrei stayed with Hakuin until he received a message from home about his mother's illness. He looked after her for two years until her death.

After his mother's death, he went to a small hermitage in Kyoto, where he undertook a very rigorous and ascetic training, which ended with a deep experience of realization. However, as a result of practicing in cold conditions he developed of tuberculosis. Unsure if he would survive, he decided to write the text Shūmon mujintō ron (The inexhaustible lamp of Zen). He was thirty years old at the time. After he was finished, his health had improved. He sent the text to Hakuin who wrote back saying that it was an excellent introduction to Zen practice. The work presents the Zen path according to the Rinzai tradition of Hakuin and attempts to promote the unity of all Buddhist schools under the Ekayana (One Vehicle) view of Zen. His work also attempts to reconcile Zen Buddhism with Confucianism, Shintoism and Taoism.

After his health improved, Tōrei began a teaching career that would last for 40 years. He received Hakuin's robe and thus became his principle Dharma heir. He also worked alongside Hakuin to develop a koan study curriculum which remains in use today.

After Hakuin's death, Tōrei retired to Ryutaku-ji and he remained there for twenty years overseeing its restoration. Towards the end of his life Tōrei returned to a small temple in his hometown, where he died in 1792.

His principle dharma heir was Tōrei Enji (1721-1792), with whom he reorganized the koan-system, and to whom he presented his robe as a token of recognition.

All contemporary Rinzai-lineages stem from Hakuin and Torei, through Gasan Jitō (1727–1797) and his students Inzan Ien (1751–1814) and Takuju Kosen (1760–1833).  Gasan is considered to be a dharma heir of Hakuin, though "he did not belong to the close circle of disciples and was probably not even one of Hakuin's dharma heirs," studying with Hakuin but completing his koan-training with Tōrei Enji.

See also
 Buddhism in Japan
 List of Rinzai Buddhists
 List of Buddhist topics
 Religions of Japan

References

Sources

 
 

Japanese scholars of Buddhism
Japanese philosophers
Buddhist artists
Japanese religious leaders
Zen Buddhist monks
Rinzai Buddhists
Japanese artists
Japanese Zen Buddhists
Edo period Buddhist clergy
People from Shiga Prefecture